Panchur College, established in 2008, is an undergraduate college in Santoshpur, Kolkata. This college is affiliated to the University of Calcutta.

Departments

Arts

Bengali
English
History
Geography
Political Science
Philosophy
Education

Accreditation
Panchur College is affiliated to University of Calcutta and recognized by the University Grants Commission (UGC).

See also 
List of colleges affiliated to the University of Calcutta
Education in India
Education in West Bengal

References

External links
http://www.panchurcollege.org/index.php

Educational institutions established in 2008
University of Calcutta affiliates
Universities and colleges in South 24 Parganas district
2008 establishments in West Bengal